USS Sphinx (ARL-24) was laid down as a United States Navy  but converted to one of 39 s that were used for repairing landing craft during World War II. Named for the Sphinx (a mythical monster formed by joining the body of a lion and the head of a human), she was the only US Naval vessel to bear the name.

Construction
Originally authorized as LST-963, the ship was redesignated as a landing craft repair ship (ARL) and named Sphinx on 11 September 1944; laid down 20 October 1944, at Hingham, Massachusetts, by the Bethlehem-Hingham Shipyard; and launched on 18 November 1944. She was placed in partial commission for ferrying to her fitting out yard, the Merrill Stevens Drydock, Jacksonville, Florida, 12 December 1944. Decommissioned 8 January 1945, for fitting out, she was recommissioned Sphinx (ARL-24), 10 May 1945.

Service history

World War II
Sphinx completed fitting out and proceeded to Norfolk, Virginia for sea trials and shakedown in Chesapeake Bay. On 12 June 1945, Sphinx sailed for the west coast; transited the Panama Canal on 23 June; and proceeded via San Diego to San Francisco. She was assigned to the Amphibious Forces, US Pacific Fleet, and ordered to Hawaii. Sphinx arrived in Pearl Harbor, on 31 July, and repaired craft there until 27 August, when she sailed for Adak, Alaska.

Before she reached Adak, her sailing orders were modified, routing her to Japan. She arrived at Mutsu Bay, Honshū, on 14 September, and began repairing and refitting minesweepers. Sphinx moved to Yokosuka, on 20 November, and sailed for Saipan, on 3 December 1945. She operated in the central Pacific islands until entering Pearl Harbor, on 9 January 1947, en route to the west coast for decontamination. The ship had participated in "Operation Crossroads," the atomic bomb tests at Bikini Atoll, in the Marshall Islands, from early April to 29 August 1946.

Sphinx arrived at San Pedro, Los Angeles, on 22 January, where she was decontaminated and prepared for inactivation. She was placed out of commission, in reserve, on 26 May 1947.

Korean War
The outbreak of hostilities in Korea created a need for Sphinxs repair facilities in the Far East. She was recommissioned on 3 November 1950. After outfitting and holding shakedown training, she stood out of San Diego, on 17 August 1951, and proceeded via Pearl Harbor to Japan. Sphinx arrived at Yokosuka, on 29 September, and operated from Japanese ports until 7 May 1952. During this time, she repaired and serviced fleet units that were being used in Korea. The ship returned to San Diego, on 4 June 1952, and operated along the California coast until redeployed to the Far East from 3 March to 9 December 1954. Sphinx operated along the west coast during 1955, and on 31 January 1956, was again placed out of commission, in reserve, and berthed at San Diego.

Vietnam War
In January 1967 orders were issued to reactivate Sphinx for use in Vietnam. She was towed to New Orleans, Louisiana, in February, and on 16 December 1967, placed in commission. The ship sailed for the west coast on 8 January 1968, and arrived at San Diego, on 23 February. On 22 April, Sphinx and  sailed for the western Pacific. The ships made port calls at Pearl Harbor, Kusaie, Guam, and Subic Bay. Sphinx sailed independently from there on 6 June, and four days later, arrived at Vũng Tàu, South Vietnam. Sphinx moved to Dong Tam Base Camp, on 11 June, and was assigned to the Mobile Riverine Force in the Mekong Delta. Her unit was Task Force (TF) 117 composed of 11 shallow-draft ships and over 150 river assault boats. The repair ship was on a non-rotating basis and, during 1969, had very little time underway. She operated in the Tien Giang and Ham Luong rivers, providing service and support for the river boats as they engaged in operations against the Viet Cong. The ship sailed from Vietnam, on 21 June, for a yard period at Sasebo, and returned on 25 August.

Upon her return to Vietnam, Sphinx operated along the Vam Co River. In addition to her regular duties, the ship served as the tactical operations center of the Can Giouc Interdiction Unit and also developed helicopter capabilities, handling 50 landings before 31 December 1969. She remained in Vietnam, until 14 December 1970, when she weighed anchor for a yard period at Yokosuka. On the last day of the year, the ship lost power in both main engines and was adrift  from Sasebo. On 2 January 1971,  took her under tow for Sasebo where she was repaired.

Sphinx was back off Vietnam, on 11 March, and remained there until sailing for the west coast several months later. She arrived at Bremerton, Washington, on 2 July, and prepared to rejoin the reserve fleet. On 30 September 1971, Sphinx was placed in reserve, out of commission, and remained berthed at Bremerton, into December 1974. Sphinx was struck from the Naval Vessel Register on 16 April 1977.

Intelligence-gatherer 
Sphinx was reacquired by the Navy in 1985, and recommissioned 26 July 1985, at Puget Sound Naval Shipyard, Bremerton. From September 1984 to July 1985, the ship went through a $25 million overhaul at the Puget Sound Naval Shipyard to become an intelligence-collection platform. It conducted patrols off the Pacific coast of El Salvador, monitoring the actions of the communist guerrilla forces. The ship was decommissioned for the last time on 16 June 1989, at Norfolk, and laid up in the National Defense Reserve Fleet, James River Group, Lee Hall, Virginia, 15 June 1990.

Museum ship
Custody of Sphinx was transferred on 2 December 2002, to the Dunkirk Historical Lighthouse and Veterans Park Museum in Dunkirk, New York, for preservation, where she was regarded as the "Sole Survivor of All LSTs in The US Mothball Fleet Today."

It was reported in May 2007, that Sphinx was being stripped of parts by groups from other historical ships, as the Dunkirk Historical group was unsuccessful in raising adequate funds to tow her to their location. In April 2007, the Maritime Administration (MARAD) retained the title and officially withdrew her from donation. On 24 August, Sphinx was sold for scrapping to North American Recycling, Inc., Sparrows Points, Maryland, as part of a five ship contract worth $2,161,610. The ship was moved to Baltimore, but the scrapper went out of business and Sphinx was abandoned along with another Atlantic Reserve Fleet ship, the former . On 30 November 2007, Sphinx was acquired by Bay Bridge Enterprises, Chesapeake, Virginia, for $695,000, who moved her to their facility for disposal. The vessel arrived at their facility on 1 December 2007.

Awards
Sphinx received one battle star for Korean service and eight campaign stars for service in Vietnam.

Notes

Citations

Bibliography 

Online resources

External links
 
 Historic Naval Ship USS Sphinx ARL-24 Memorial

 

Achelous-class repair ships
Achelous-class repair ships converted from LST-542-class ships
Cold War auxiliary ships of the United States
Historic American Engineering Record in Virginia
Korean War auxiliary ships of the United States
Ships built in Hingham, Massachusetts
Vietnam War auxiliary ships of the United States
World War II auxiliary ships of the United States
1945 ships